Sköllersta IF is a Swedish football club located in Sköllersta in Hallsberg Municipality, Örebro County.

Background
Since their foundation Sköllersta IF has participated mainly in the middle and lower divisions of the Swedish football league system.  The club currently plays in Division 5 Örebro Län which is the seventh tier of Swedish football. They play their home matches at the Sköllervallen IP in Sköllersta.

Sköllersta IF are affiliated to Örebro Läns Fotbollförbund.

Recent history
In recent seasons Sköllersta IF have competed in the following divisions:

Alla tidigare tabeller
2014 - Division VI, Örebro Län
2013 - Division V, Örebro Län
2012 - Division III, Västra Svealand
2011 - Division III, Västra Svealand
2010 - Division IV, Örebro Län
2009 - Division III, Västra Svealand
2008 - Division IV, Örebro Län
2007 - Division IV, Örebro Län
2006 - Division IV, Örebro Län
2005 - Division IV, Örebro Län
2004 - Division IV, Örebro Län
2003 - Division IV, Örebro Län
2002 - Division IV, Örebro Län
2001 - Division IV, Örebro Län
2000 - Division III, Västra Svealand
1999 - Division IV, Örebro Län

Attendances

In recent seasons Sköllersta IF have had the following average attendances:

Footnotes

External links 
 Sköllersta IF - Official website
 Sköllersta IF on Facebook

Football clubs in Örebro County